"Heaven" is a song co-written and performed by American contemporary R&B band Solo, issued as the first single from their eponymous debut studio album. The song was the band's highest chart appearance on the Billboard Hot 100, peaking at No. 42 in 1995.

The official music video for the song was directed by Alan Ferguson (under the pseudonym Sky Dalton).

Charts

Weekly charts

Year-end charts

References

External links
 
 

1995 songs
1995 debut singles
Music videos directed by Alan Ferguson (director)
Perspective Records singles
Solo (American band) songs
Song recordings produced by Jimmy Jam and Terry Lewis
Songs written by Jimmy Jam and Terry Lewis